José Ramón López Hevia (May 26, 1933, in Las Villas, Cuba – September 4, 1982) was a professional baseball player who played one season for the California Angels of Major League Baseball.

References

1933 births
1982 deaths
California Angels players
Cocoa Indians players
North Platte Indians players
Major League Baseball pitchers
Major League Baseball players from Cuba
Cuban expatriate baseball players in the United States
People from Villa Clara Province